The NCAA Division II Women's Outdoor Track and Field Championships are the annual collegiate track and field competitions for women athletes representing Division II institutions organised by the National Collegiate Athletic Association. Athletes' performances in individual championships earn points for their institutions and the team with the most points receives the NCAA team title in track and field.

A separate NCAA Division II men's competition is also held. These two events are separate from the NCAA Division II Women's Indoor Track and Field Championships and NCAA Division II Men's Indoor Track and Field Championships held during the winter.

The first edition of the championship was held in 1982.

The current team champions are West Texas A&M, and the most successful team, with ten titles, were the Abilene Christian Wildcats.

Summary

 † Appearances vacated by the NCAA Committee on Infractions

Champions

Team titles
 Updated through 2022.

Individual titles

 Schools highlight in yellow have reclassified athletics from NCAA Division II.

See also
NCAA Women's Outdoor Track and Field Championship (Division I, Division III)
NCAA Men's Outdoor Track and Field Championship (Division I, Division II, Division III)
NCAA Women's Indoor Track and Field Championships (Division I, Division II, Division III)
NCAA Men's Indoor Track and Field Championship (Division I, Division II, Division III)
AIAW Intercollegiate Women's Outdoor Track and Field Champions
NAIA Women's Outdoor Track and Field Championship
Pre-NCAA Outdoor Track and Field Champions

References

External links
NCAA Division II women's outdoor track and field

 Outdoor
Outdoor track, women, Division II
Outdoor track, women's
Women's athletics competitions